Samuel Henry Windrush Middleton (27 September 1901 – 6 January 1949) was an Irish first-class cricketer.

Middleton was born at Greystones in County Wicklow in September 1901, and was educated at St. Andrew's College, Dublin. He later studied at the University of Dublin. While studying at the university, he made one appearance in first-class cricket for Dublin University against Essex at Brentwood during their 1922 tour of England. He failed to score any runs or take any wickets during the match. He was capped once for Ireland in a non first-class match in 1921 against the Military at Dublin. The match was abandoned after two gunmen opened fire on the players, killing a spectator. He died at Dublin in January 1949.

References

External links

1901 births
1949 deaths
People from Greystones
People educated at St Andrew's College, Dublin
Alumni of Trinity College Dublin
Irish cricketers
Dublin University cricketers